María Fernanda Murillo Duarte (born 21 January 1999) is a Colombian athlete specialising in the high jump. She won a bronze medal at the 2018 World U20 Championships in addition to multiple medals at regional level.

Her personal best in the event is 1.94 metres set in Medellín in 2019.

International competitions

References

1999 births
Living people
Colombian female high jumpers
Central American and Caribbean Games bronze medalists for Colombia
Competitors at the 2018 Central American and Caribbean Games
Athletes (track and field) at the 2019 Pan American Games
Pan American Games competitors for Colombia
South American Championships in Athletics winners
Central American and Caribbean Games medalists in athletics
Athletes (track and field) at the 2018 South American Games
Ibero-American Championships in Athletics winners
South American Games gold medalists in athletics
21st-century Colombian women